The Namakura language, Makura or Namakir, is an Oceanic language of Vanuatu. The language is spoken in Shefa Province, north Efate, Tongoa, and Tongariki.

Phonology

Consonants 

 /ⁿd/ can also range to a retroflex  in free variation. When followed by a /r/, it is then realized as a trilled-articulated sound .
 /r/ can be heard as a flap  in initial position and as a trill  elsewhere.

Vowels 

 Two nasal vowel sounds [ẽ õ] are also rarely heard.
 /i/ when preceding a vowel can be heard as a glide [j].

External links 
 Materials on Makura are included in a number of collections held by Paradisec.

References

Notes

Central Vanuatu languages